A Gypsy Good Time is a 1992 noir detective novel by Vietnam War veteran Gustav Hasford and the last novel he completed before his death in 1993, at forty-five years old. It is written in the style of classic hardboiled detective fiction and was poorly received by book critics at the time for making too much use of the cliches of the genre. A Gypsy Good Time never received the same critical recognition as Hasford's novels on Vietnam, The Short-Timers (1979) and The Phantom Blooper (1990), and is relatively unknown even among the author's followers. The book is reportedly based on Hasford's disillusionment with Hollywood during the production of Full Metal Jacket (1987).

Plot
Vietnam veteran and Private Investigator Dowdy Lewis, Jr. struggles with alcoholism, his time in the Vietnam War, and his own rapid aging. He meets Yvonna Lablaine, an attractive, red-headed outcast from a prominent Hollywood family, and falls in love. One day, however, after a brief but passionate romance, Lewis finds Lablaine dying at his door, murdered. He then embarks on a quest involving drug dealers, mobsters, and Hollywood moguls in order to find the truth about what happened and to take revenge on the culprits.

Availability
According to the Official Gustav Hasford Website maintained by Hasford's cousin, The Short-Timers, The Phantom Blooper, and A Gypsy Good Time, are currently out of print. The texts of the two war novels and an excerpt of A Gypsy Good Time were publicly available at the website for at least a decade, but the site has since been redesigned, and Hasford's cousin, who manages the site, has stated he "likely won't be reposting the novel" there.

References

American mystery novels
1992 American novels
Washington Square Press books